Phyllogeiton is a small genus of flowering plants in the family Rhamnaceae, native to eastern and southern Africa, Madagascar, and the Arabian Peninsula. It was resurrected from Berchemia.

Species
The following species are accepted:
Phyllogeiton discolor  – bird plum or brown ivory
Phyllogeiton zeyheri  – pink ivory

References

Rhamnaceae
Rhamnaceae genera
Flora of the Democratic Republic of the Congo
Flora of Northeast Tropical Africa
Flora of East Tropical Africa
Flora of South Tropical Africa
Flora of Southern Africa
Flora of Madagascar
Flora of Saudi Arabia
Flora of Yemen